Mount Zion is a village in Macon County, Illinois, United States. The population was 6,019 at the 2020 census.

Geography 
Mount Zion is located in southeastern Macon County at  (39.777967, -88.878614). It is bordered to the northwest by the city of Decatur, the county seat, and to the north by the village of Long Creek. Illinois Route 121 passes through the village, leading northwest  to the center of Decatur and southeast  to Sullivan.

The village is drained to the north by Finley Creek and Big Creek, part of the Sangamon River watershed.

Demographics 

At the 2010 census there were 5,833 people, 1,819 households, and 1,409 families in the village. The racial makeup of the village was 98.08% White, 0.25% African American, 0.23% Native American, 0.76% Asian, and 0.68% from two or more races. Hispanic or Latino people of any race were 0.25%.

Of the 1,819 households 39.7% had children under the age of 18 living with them, 67.2% were married couples living together, 8.0% had a female householder with no husband present, and 22.5% were non-families. 19.8% of households were one person and 5.8% were one person aged 65 or older.  The average household size was 2.63 and the average family size was 3.03.

The age distribution was 28.3% under the age of 18, 7.2% from 18 to 24, 28.0% from 25 to 44, 26.2% from 45 to 64, and 10.3% 65 or older.  The median age was 38 years.  For every 100 females there were 100.1 males.  For every 100 females age 18 and over, there were 95.7 males.

The median household income was in 2012 was $60,732. The per capita income for the village was $30,243.  About 4.9% of families and 5.0% of the population were below the poverty line, including 6.4% of those under the age of 18 and 5.1% of those 65 and older.

For population 25 years and over in Mount Zion:
 High school or higher: 96.4%
 Bachelor's degree or higher: 36.0%
 Graduate or professional degree: 13.0%
 Unemployed: 2.7%
 Mean travel time to work (commute): 19.9 minutes

Education
Mount Zion High School is part of the Mount Zion Unified School District 3, and was founded in 1920. As of 2021, the high school ranks 191st out of Illinois high schools. 

Mount Zion is also home to Mount Zion Grade School, Mount Zion Intermediate School, Mount Zion Jr. High School, and McGaughey Elementary School.

Parks
Spitler Woods State Natural Area borders the village to the east. Fort Daniel Conservation Area is a mile further to the east. Fletcher Park, a recreation area, borders the village to the south.

References

Villages in Macon County, Illinois